Alfred Roques (17 February 1925 - 7 November 2004) was a French rugby union player who played at prop for the France national rugby union team.

Early life and career 
Alfred Roques was born on February 17, 1925, in Cazes-Mondenard, France. 

Roques earned his first cap for the France national rugby union team on March 9, 1958.  

He made a total of 30 official appearances for the French national team between 1958 and 1963.

Roques was part of the French national team that won the Five Nations Championship in 1959, 1960, 1961 and 1962.

Death 
Roques died at the age of 79 in Cahors, France, on November 7, 2004.

See also 

 France national rugby union team

References 

French rugby union players
Rugby union props
2004 deaths

1925 births
France international rugby union players